Tillandsia argentea, called the silver-leaved air plant, is a species of flowering plant in the bromeliad genus Tillandsia, native to Cuba and Jamaica. An evergreen perennial epiphyte, it has gained the Royal Horticultural Society's Award of Garden Merit as a houseplant.

References

argentea
Flora of Cuba
Flora of Jamaica
Epiphytes
Plants described in 1866
Flora without expected TNC conservation status